Eyralpenus testacea is a moth of the family Erebidae. It was described by Francis Walker in 1855. It is found in the Democratic Republic of the Congo and South Africa.

References

 

Spilosomina
Moths described in 1855